No Diggity: The Very Best of Blackstreet is a greatest hits compilation by R&B group Blackstreet, released on June 10, 2003.

Track listing

Notes 
 Tracks 1–6 are from the album Blackstreet
 Tracks 7, 9–13 and 17 are from the album Another Level
 Tracks 16 are from the album Finally
 Track 8 originally appeared as a remix on the "No Diggity" single and was referred to as "No Diggity (Billie Jean Remix)".
 Track 14 originally appeared on the soundtrack to the 1996 Spike Lee film Get On The Bus, and later on the soundtrack to the 1997 film Steel
 Track 15 is from Foxy Brown's album Ill Na Na

References 

2003 greatest hits albums
Blackstreet albums